Annie E. McDaniel is an American politician. She is a member of the South Carolina House of Representatives from the 41st District, serving since 2018. She is a member of the Democratic party.

McDaniel serves as 1st Vice Chair of the House Operations and Management Committee, and as a member of the Agricultural, Natural Resources and Environmental Affairs Committee. She is incoming Chair of the South Carolina Legislative Black Caucus.

References

Living people
Democratic Party members of the South Carolina House of Representatives
African-American people in South Carolina politics
21st-century American politicians
University of South Carolina alumni
1968 births
21st-century African-American politicians
20th-century African-American people

Women state legislators in South Carolina